Swiss Miss is a brand name for cocoa powder and pudding products invented by Charles Sanna and sold by American food company Conagra Brands.

History
In the 1950s, the company sold its original hot cocoa product as an onboard beverage to airline passengers. Only after the drink became popular did it sell products in grocery stores.

References

External links 

 Official website

Conagra Brands brands
Products introduced in 1950
Chocolate drinks
Instant foods and drinks
Powdered drink mixes